Simone Fraccaro (born 1 January 1952) is an Italian former professional racing cyclist. He rode in three editions of the Tour de France and eight editions of the Giro d'Italia.

References

External links
 

1952 births
Living people
Italian male cyclists
Cyclists from the Province of Treviso